Museums in Prague.

Museum institutions

Art museums and galleries
 Museum of Decorative Arts in Prague
 Galerie Rudolfinum
 National Gallery Prague
Convent of Saint Agnes

Kinský Palace

 Galerie Cesty ke světlu
 House of the Black Madonna
 Josef Sudek Gallery
 Museum Kampa
 The Václav Špála Gallery
 DOX Center for Contemporary Art

Cultural and historical museums
 City of Prague Museum
 National Museum
 Lapidarium, Prague
Náprstek Museum

 Jewish Museum in Prague
Ceremonial Hall of the Prague Jewish Burial Society
 Maisel Synagogue
Pinkas Synagogue
 Ss. Cyril and Methodius Cathedral (The National Memorial to the Heroes of the Heydrich Terror)

Memorial museums and commemorative collections
 Antonín Dvořák Museum
 Bedřich Smetana Museum
 Bertramka: Mozart Museum

Technical and natural-history museums
 National Technical Museum (Prague)
 Kepler Museum
 Prague Aviation Museum, Kbely
 Czech Police Museum

Tourist attractions 

 Madame Tussauds Prague
 Museum of Communism
 Sex Machines Museum
 Apple Museum, Prague
 Mucha Museum
 Franz Kafka Museum

See also
 List of museums in the Czech Republic

 
Prague
Museums
Museums
Museums in Prague